Ammoglanis is a genus of pencil catfishes native to South America.

Taxonomy
The phylogenetic position of A. pulex is problematic. It seems to be closely related to A. diaphanus due to some derived characters of the internal anatomy, but a conclusive assessment of its relationships has not been prevented by its paedomorphic features and scarcity of study material. This generic placement seems to be well supported.

The relationships of the genus Ammoglanis are unknown; it is thought that this genus along with undescribed forms are the sister group to a large intrafamilial clade composed of several genera and subfamilies. In the interim, this genus is included within Sarcoglanidinae.

Species
There are currently five recognized species in this genus:
 Ammoglanis amapaensis Mattos, Costa & Gama, 2008
 Ammoglanis diaphanus Costa, 1994
Ammoglanis natgeorum 
Ammoglanis obliquus 
 Ammoglanis pulex de Pinna & Winemiller, 2000

Distribution
A. amapaensis originates from three different drainages of the Amazon River, the Jari, Amapari, and Araguari River. A. diaphanus originates from a stream tributary to the Javaés River of the Araguaia River basin in Tocantins, Brazil. A. pulex originates from the Paria Grande River, the Pamoni River, and Caño Garrapata of Venezuela. A. obliquus is only known from the Rio Preta da Eva drainage basin.

Description
Ammoglanis species grow to about  SL. A. pulex is among the smallest known vertebrates. A. pulex can be distinguished from A. diaphanus by a number of characteristics, including the presence of a faint pattern of eight bands formed by internal chromatophores and the lack of teeth.

Ecology
A. diaphanus inhabits shallow, narrow, clear water, moderately swift-flowing stream and is found buried in the sand. It feeds on Diptera larvae and a cladocerans. A. pulex is a translucent light-pink fish that camouflages well in sand. A. pulex is found in sand banks near the shorelines of clear water and slightly tea-stained streams. Apparently fossorial by daylight, it is found buried in coarse clear sand at the stream edge, in areas shaded by dense tropical rainforest. A. pulex is thought to feed on microscopic fauna like protozoa, rotifers, and nematodes since it inhabits interstitial spaces among sand grains in nutrient-poor, clear-water and backwater streams.

References

Trichomycteridae
Fish of South America
Fish of the Amazon basin]
Fauna of Brazil
Fish of Venezuela
Freshwater fish genera
Catfish genera